Glyphipterix medica is a moth in the  family Glyphipterigidae. It is known from South Africa and the Seychelles.

References

Glyphipterigidae
Moths of Africa
Fauna of Seychelles
Moths described in 1911